Jim Del Gaizo (born May 31, 1947) is a former professional American football quarterback for the Miami Dolphins, Green Bay Packers, and New York Giants. His career in the National Football League (NFL) lasted five seasons

Early life
Born in Everett, Massachusetts, and raised in Revere, Del Gaizo was the star quarterback for Revere High School, and still holds the Patriots' most notable passing records.

Career
After playing college football at both Syracuse and Tampa, Del Gaizo went unselected in the 1971 NFL Draft, which had only three quarterbacks taken in the first six rounds and only seventeen selected over the entire seventeen rounds. He is one of only two quarterbacks ever to play at Tampa who appeared in the NFL. Del Gaizo made the Dolphins' roster as an undrafted free agent in 1971 and spent the season as the third-string quarterback and was not activated the entire season.

In Del Gaizo's rookie season (his second season although his first one on an active roster), he was the backup quarterback in four appearances during the Dolphins' undefeated  season in 1972 that culminated in a victory in Super Bowl VII. Del Gaizo completed 5 of 9 passes for two touchdowns and one interception; he also lost one fumble.

The Dolphins did not retain Del Gaizo's services for the 1973 season; however, his stock had risen after two good preseasons coupled with his game performances in the 1972 season, and he was traded to the Packers for two second round picks (one in 1974 and one in 1975). Green Bay is where he saw his most extensive game action, appearing in eight games while starting three. He suffered a separated shoulder early, and his final statistics were: 27 completions in 69 passing attempts with two touchdowns, six interceptions, and one fumble. In the strike season of 1974, he was traded to the Giants for a third round draft pick.

Del Gaizo's final season in 1975 was spent with the Giants, where he appeared in four games (one start), completing 12 of 32 passes with no touchdowns and three interceptions. The Giants released him and Del Gaizo never appeared in another NFL regular season game. However, he was re-signed by the Dolphins for the second half of the 1975 season after injuries had sidelined both Bob Griese and Earl Morrall, and was on the roster for the final three games of the season, but did not play.

He was invited to camp the following season, and played in the 1976 pre-season for the Dolphins, where he completed 25 passes out of 40 attempts, for 372 yards, three touchdowns, and no interceptions; however, he was cut by the Dolphins. Del Gaizo entertained starting job offers from the Atlanta Falcons and Buffalo Bills, as well as a back-up offer from the Pittsburgh Steelers (which he was quoted as saying later he should have probably accepted); however, disillusioned with both pro football and the Miami Dolphins (where he felt he had earned his spot), he decided to retire at the age of 29.

Since retirement, Del Gaizo has enjoyed a successful career as a mortgage broker.

References

 Career statistics at pro-football-reference.com
 Update on Del Gaizo (follows golf story)
 1972 NFL draft list
 "Downfield! Untold Stories Of The Green Bay Packers", by Jerry Polling. Copyright 1996
 The Miami Herald, Tuesday, Sept. 7, 1976 Front Page Article of Section D, "Del Gaizo Losses QB Roulette"

External links
 

1947 births
Living people
People from Revere, Massachusetts
Players of American football from Massachusetts
American football quarterbacks
Green Bay Packers players
Miami Dolphins players
New York Giants players
Syracuse Orange football players
Tampa Spartans football players
Revere High School (Massachusetts) alumni